The Consensus 2001 College Basketball All-American team, as determined by aggregating the results of four major All-American teams.  To earn "consensus" status, a player must win honors from a majority of the following teams: the Associated Press, the USBWA, The Sporting News and the National Association of Basketball Coaches.

2001 Consensus All-America team

Individual All-America teams

AP Honorable Mention:

Gilbert Arenas, Arizona
Craig Austin, Columbia
Cory Bradford, Illinois
Tarise Bryson, Illinois State
Torrey Butler, Coastal Carolina
Casey Calvary, Gonzaga
Jarron Collins, Stanford
Jason Collins, Stanford
Juan Dixon, Maryland
Teddy Dupay, Florida
Melvin Ely, Fresno State
George Evans, George Mason
Reggie Evans, Iowa
Jason Gardner, Arizona
Jerry Green, UC Irvine
Kenny Gregory, Kansas
Eddie Griffin, Seton Hall
Trenton Hassell, Austin Peay
Brendan Haywood, North Carolina
Brian Heinle, Cal State Northridge
Dewayne Jefferson, Mississippi Valley State
Joe Johnson, Arkansas
Ken Johnson, Ohio State
Rahsaan Johnson, Monmouth
Jason Kapono, UCLA
Sean Lampley, California
Steve Logan, Cincinnati
Shernard Long, Georgia State
Jody Lumpkin, College of Charleston
Demond Mallet, McNeese State
Chris Marcus, Western Kentucky
Ronnie McCollum, Centenary
Jeff Monaco, Southern Utah
Terence Morris, Maryland
Brett Nelson, Florida
Rashad Phillips, Detroit
Norman Richardson, Hofstra
Kareem Rush, Missouri
Preston Shumpert, Syracuse
Demond Stewart, Niagara
Tim Szatko, Holy Cross
David Webber, Central Michigan
Mekeli Wesley, Brigham Young
David West, Xavier
Rodney White, Charlotte
Tarvis Williams, Hampton
Loren Woods, Arizona

References

NCAA Men's Basketball All-Americans
All-Americans